WLAK (1260 kHz) is an AM radio station established in 1978. The station is licensed to serve Amery, Wisconsin, United States. The station is owned by Sage Weil and Michael Crute, through licensee Civic Media, Inc.

WLAK has an FM translator on the frequency of 107.3 MHz. It simulcasts the programming of WLAK.

On April 28, 2020, the then-WXCE changed its format to active rock, simulcasting WXNK 940 AM Shell Lake.

In 2021, WXCE switched from a WXNK simulcast to a simulcast of Soft AC formatted FM sister station WZEZ. 

On November 11, 2021, WXCE went silent.

In September 2022, WXCE returned on the air as a progressive talk format branded as "Lake Air Radio", operated by Michael Crute's Civic Media under a time brokerage agreement; Civic Media was in the process of acquiring the station and its translator, along with two sister stations. The purchase was consummated on December 29, 2022 at a price of $700,000. Effective January 29, 2023, the new owners changed the station's call sign to WLAK.

References

External links

LAK (AM)
Radio stations established in 1979
1979 establishments in Wisconsin
Progressive talk radio